Alexander J. Coffin (December 16, 1794 – April 23, 1868 Poughkeepsie, Dutchess County, New York) was an American politician from New York.

Life
He was the son of Eliab Coffin (c. 1756–1841) and Mary (Jenkins) Coffin (b. 1761). On April 8, 1819, he married Lydia Stratton (1798–1832), and they had three children.

He was a presidential elector in 1824.

He was a member of the New York State Senate (8th D.) in 1848 and 1849.

He was buried at the Friends Ground in Poughkeepsie.

Sources
The New York Civil List compiled by Franklin Benjamin Hough (pages 136, 139 and 326; Weed, Parsons and Co., 1858)
Coffin genealogy at Nantucket Historical Association

External links

1794 births
1868 deaths
New York (state) state senators
New York (state) Whigs
19th-century American politicians
Politicians from Poughkeepsie, New York
1824 United States presidential electors